Gilson Anjos is a paralympic athlete from Brazil competing mainly in category T13 middle-distance events.

In the 2004 Summer Paralympics Gilson competed in the 800m and 1500m winning a silver in the 800m.  He also competed in the 2008 Summer Paralympics in the 400m and 1500m but missed out on medals.

References

External links
 

Year of birth missing (living people)
Living people
Paralympic athletes of Brazil
Paralympic silver medalists for Brazil
Paralympic medalists in athletics (track and field)
Athletes (track and field) at the 2004 Summer Paralympics
Athletes (track and field) at the 2008 Summer Paralympics
Medalists at the 2004 Summer Paralympics
Brazilian male middle-distance runners
20th-century Brazilian people
21st-century Brazilian people